A Piano for Mrs. Cimino is a 1982 American made-for-television drama film produced and directed by George Schaefer. The teleplay by John Gay is based on the novel of the same name by Robert Oliphant. It was broadcast on February 3 by CBS.

Plot
The story focuses on Esther Cimino, an aging piano teacher who is misdiagnosed as having dementia shortly after her husband passes away. Her son George has her declared incompetent and puts her affairs in the hands of a questionable trustee. Her granddaughter Karen places the woman in a convalescent home overseen by a caring director, and under his patient care Mrs. Cimino blossoms, only to learn her business, home, and all her possessions, including her beloved piano, were sold during her confinement.

With her dignity and health restored, Mrs. Cimino tries to regain control of her life by establishing her independence and retaining control over her remaining assets. Assisting her in her battles is her long lost friend Barney Fellman, who brings her the unexpected promise of romance in her later years.

Cast
 Bette Davis as Esther Cimino
 Keenan Wynn as Barney Fellman
 Alexa Kenin  as Karen Cimino
 George Hearn  as  George Cimino
 Penny Fuller  as Mrs. Polanski
 Christopher Guest  as  Philip Ryan
 Graham Jarvis  as  Leach
 Eda Reiss Merin  as  Mrs. Gatlin
 Karen Austin	 as 	Alice Cimino

References

External links
 

1982 television films
1982 films
1982 drama films
CBS network films
Films about old age
Films about pianos and pianists
Films based on American novels
Films directed by George Schaefer
Films with screenplays by John Gay (screenwriter)
American drama television films
1980s American films